Brazen Beau  (foaled 24 September 2011) is a multiple Group 1 winning Australian thoroughbred racehorse, and current successful stallion.

Background

Brazen Beau was bred in Canberra by Group 1 winning jockey and trainer Bernie Howlett. Howlett won the Group 1 Sydney Cup as a jockey in 1959 aboard On Line and the 1961 Cup with Sharply. As a trainer he won the 1996 Doomben 10,000 with Suntain.

Howlett raced and owned Brazen Beau's mother Sansadee who won three races, with her best result a third placing in the 2003 Black Opal Stakes behind Handsome Ransom and Exceed And Excel.

Howlett decided to support Yarraman Park Stud's first season sire I Am Invincible and sent his mare Sansadee to the stallion. After Brazen Beau was born he was sold by Howlett for $70,000 at the 2013 Inglis Classic Yearling sale. He was purchased by Grant Morgan of Ontrack Thoroughbreds, and the colt was syndicated to a group of 38 owners from across Australia.

Racing career

Brazen Beau won his first ever race at Canterbury Park Racecourse.  His other win as a two year old was the Champagne Classic at Doomben.  On both occasions, he was ridden by Nash Rawiller.

As a three year old, he was successful in two Group 1 races at Flemington, the Coolmore Stud Stakes and the Newmarket Handicap.  In both races he was ridden by João Moreira.

Brazen Beau finished his racing career in England.  He raced on two occasions, finisishing second in the Diamond Jubilee Stakes when ridden by Craig Williams and seventh in the July Cup when ridden by James Doyle at his last ever race start.

Stud career

Brazen Beau was sold to Godolphin's breeding operation Darley Stud for a reported A$10 million. He undertakes shuttle stallion duties between Darley's Dalham Hall Stud in England and Northwood Park farm in Victoria, Australia.

Notable stock

Brazen Beau's Group One winners:

c = colt, f = filly, g = gelding

Pedigree

References 

Australian racehorses
Racehorses bred in Australia
Racehorses trained in Australia
2011 racehorse births
Thoroughbred family 4-g